Masudi-ye Do (also Romanized as Mas‘ūdī-ye Do; also known as Mas‘ūdīyeh-ye Do) is a village in Darkhoveyn Rural District, in the Central District of Shadegan County, Khuzestan Province, Iran. At the 2006 census, its population was 88, in 22 families.

References 

Populated places in Shadegan County